Vinayaka Geleyara Balaga is a 2011 Kannada movie starring Vijay Raghavendra, Naveen Krishna and Meghana Gaonkar. It is based on a real-life incident in Bangalore's Prakash Nagar in 1985. It is directed by V. Nagendra Prasad. V. Harikrishna has composed the music and 'Safety' Prakash is the cinematographer.

Cast
Vijay Raghavendra as Viji 
 Naveen Krishna
 Meghana Gaonkar
 Rangayana Raghu
 Shobharaj
 Chi. Guru Dutt
 Petrol Prasanna

Music

Reception

Critical response 

A critic from The New Indian Express wrote "This leads to a clash between the friends and the goonda. However, they use their brain and put the rowdy behind bars. The Ganesh Utsav happens successfully but then Razor Raja comes out on bail and he decides to take revenge. What happens after that forms the rest of the story". A critic from News18 India wrote "Hari Krishna composes three fantastic songs including the much popular 'Yaarivali Hudugi' and the devotional number 'Vakrathunda'. Malavalli Sai Krishna has penned funny and catchy dialogues. 'Vinayaka Geleyara Balaga' is a thoroughly enjoyable fare". Shreyas Nag from Deccan Herald wrote "Vinayaka Geleyara Balaga is an absolute mass entertainer for the ones with a liking for spending time and money for everything except devotion at the time of festivals".

References

2011 films
2010s Kannada-language films
Films scored by V. Harikrishna
Films directed by V. Nagendra Prasad